Abbasov Azat Zinnät ulı (Cyrillic: Аббасов Азат Зиннәт улы; ; ; 19 January 1925 – 11 October 2006) was a Tatar opera singer (lyric-dramatic tenor) who was awarded with the People's Artist of the USSR in 1977.

He graduated from Kazan Aviation Technical School and worked at the "Kazan Helicopters" plant as a designer. In 1944, when the friend of Abbasovs' family, Tatar composer Salix Säydäş advised him to devote himself to professional singing, Azat entered the Tatar National Opera Studio within the Moscow Conservatory. He graduated from the conservatory in 1950 and returned to Kazan. In 1950s-1990s he was a soloist of Kazan-based Musa Cälil Tatar Opera and Ballet Theatre.

Abbasov performed more than 100 parts in almost all leading performances. Major parts were  Cälil, Tüläk (Cälil, Tülär and Susılu by Näcip Cihanov), Samat (Samat by Xösnulla Wäliulllin), Alfredo Gérmont (La traviata by Giuseppe Verdi), Sergey (Katerina Izmaylova by Dmitry Shostakovich).

He was known for the high vocal culture with an extremely accurate diction. His repertoire had  large variety; it contained Russian, Tatar, and Western European opera classics. His merits in vocal art development are highly appreciated: he was given a rank of the Honoured Artist of Tatarstan, the People's and Honoured artist of Russia and the USSR.

References 
 

1925 births
2006 deaths
People from Yelabuga
People's Artists of the USSR
Russian operatic tenors
Tatar people of the Soviet Union
Tatar musicians
Soviet male opera singers
Soviet tenors
Moscow Conservatory alumni